Akō Unka ware (赤穂雲火焼) is a type of Japanese pottery traditionally made in Akō, Hyōgo prefecture.

References

External links 
 http://www.unkayaki.com
 http://momoi-museum.com/魅る

Culture in Hyōgo Prefecture
Japanese pottery